The 1992 Virginia Tech Hokies football team represented the Virginia Polytechnic Institute and State University during the 1992 NCAA Division I-A football season. The team's head coach was Frank Beamer.

This would prove to be the last Hokies team not to play in a bowl game until 2020, as Virginia Tech would play in a bowl game for 27 consecutive seasons, from 1993 through 2019.

Schedule

References

Virginia Tech
Virginia Tech Hokies football seasons
Virginia Tech Hokies football